Tryphiodorus (3rd or 4th century AD) was an epic poet from Panopolis (today Akhmim), Egypt. His only surviving work is The Sack of Troy, an epic poem in 691 verses. Other recorded titles include Marathoniaca and The Story of Hippodamea.

During his lifetime he was known as Triphiodorus ( [a local god of Akhim]). The confusion between the two spellings occurred already in the sixth century AD due to the widespread confusion of the pronunciation of i/y. A false etymology claims spelling "Tryphiodorus" is based on the Greek word "truphē," meaning "luxury" or "extravagance".

Life 

There is little known about the life of Triphiodorus other than two entries in the Byzantine encyclopedia the Suda (T 1111 and 1112), thought to refer to the same individual. The Suda provides his place of birth, that he was a grammarian and epic poet, but not when he lived. Traditionally he was dated to the fifth century because he was thought imitate the Dionysiaca of Nonnus of Panopolis (then dated to the fourth or fifth century), and he was in his turn imitated by Coluthus (he lived under emperor Anastasius I). However, the publication in the 1970s of a fragment of papyrus from Oxyrhynchus (P. Oxy. 41.2946), containing lines 301-402 of the Sack of Troy and dated to the third or early fourth century, has made most scholars place him in the third century (see the editions of Livrea, Gerlaud and Dubielzig).

Triphiodorus' pagan name cannot be considered a proof that he was a pagan, and nothing in his poem allows us to call him a Christian: the reference in lines 604–5 to children paying with their lives for the sins of their parents is not decisive, having classical parallels such as Homer Iliad 3.298-301.

Writings

The Taking of Ilios 
Triphiodorus' only extant work is The Sack of Troy, a 691-verse epic poem, narrating events from the capture of the Trojan seer Helenus to the sailing of the Greek troops after the capture of Troy.

The poem begins with an invocation to Calliope, the Muse of epic poetry (lines 1–5). The narrative is introduced with a summary of the dire situation of the troops of the Greeks and Trojans (lines 6-39): both are mined by the tiredness of years of fighting and heavy casualties. Then the Greeks capture the Trojan seer and following his advice call Neoptolemus (Achilles’ son) to join their lines and steal the Palladion from Troy (lines 40–56). The construction of the Trojan Horse follows and Triphiodorus gives a long description (lines 57–107). The Greeks have an assembly in which Odysseus convinces the most brave fighters to hide with him in the horse and the rest of the troops to pretend they are fleeing from Troy, while preparing to come back the following night (108-234). The following morning the Trojans discover the disappearance of the Achaean army, inspect their camp and admire the Wooden Horse (235-57). Sinon appears before them covered in blood and convinces Priam to take the horse into their citadel to win Athena's attention and avoid that she helps the Greeks to return (258-303). The Trojans transport the horse and break the otherwise indestructible walls of Troy to bring it into their citadel (304-57). Cassandra tries to make them come into their senses but Priam orders to lock her up (358-443). While they are celebrating the end of the war, Aphrodite tells Helen to join Menelaus (who is hiding in the horse). Helen goes to the temple of Athena where the horse is kept and calls the names of the wives of the hidden heroes, so as to tempt them to come out. One of them, Anticlus, is about to give in forcing Odysseus to strangle him, while Athena orders Helen to go to her room and light a torch to call the Greek fleet back to Troy for the final battle (454-98a). While the Trojans are overcome by a deep slumber, the gods abandon Troy and Helen and Sinon light torches to guide the return of the Greek fleet (498b-521). The fleet arrives and the hidden warriors leave the horse, giving start to a long night of fighting, full of dramatic episodes (506-663). The poet then decides to put a stop to the narrative and conclude (664-7). The poem finishes with the a brief description of how at the beginning of the new day, the victors check for survivors and booty, set Troy on fire, sacrifice Polyxena to appease the spirit of Achilles, distribute the booty and leave for good (668-91).

The Sack of Troy can be considered part of a late antique vogue for mythological epic, which includes the Posthomerica by Quintus of Smyrna (third century AD), the Dionysiaca by Nonnus of Panopolis (mid fifth c. AD), the Rape of Helen (by Colluthus) and the Description of the Statues in the Terms of Zeuxippus by Christodorus (early sixth century, transmitted as book 2 of the Palatine Anthology).

In this poem Triphiodorus shows a deep understanding of Homer and the grammatical tradition of interpretation of the Homeric poems (e.g. in lines 60-1 he shows that he knows about the editorial tradition of Homer Iliad 5.62-4). He quotes Hesiod (especially Triph. 136–8, after Hes. Op. 57–8) and Pindar (Triph. 643, after Pi. N. 7.42), Hellenistic poetry (e.g. Triph. 318–35, after AR 1.362-90). His portrayal of Cassandra is reminiscent of Aeschylus in his Agamemnon and Euripides in Trojan Women.

Regarding a possible influence of Virgil Aeneid 2, there are some glaring differences between the two accounts of the end of Troy: Virgil develops the character of Laocoön (A. 2.40-56, 199–231), and only mentions Cassandra (246-7), while Triphiodorus focuses on Cassandra (358-443) and does not mention Laocoön. On the contrary, Virgil and Triphiodorus are particularly close in the treatment of the figure of Sinon, in particular in their speeches (compare Aeneid 2.76-96, 103–4, 189–94, and Triph. 265–82, 292–303).

Other works 
Besides the Sack of Troy, the entries of the Suda (T 1111 and 1112) attribute to Triphiodorus two more poems: Marathoniaca, probably narrating how Theseus defeated the bull of Marathon; a Story of Hippodamea, on one of the females of this name (e.g. the daughter of King Oenomaus, who killed all her suitors in a chariot race until Pelops defeated him). The Suda also mentions two grammatical works: the Lipogrammatic Odyssey (probably a re-writing of the Odyssey suppressing a letter in each of the books: α in book 1, β in book 2 and so on) and a Paraphrase of Homer’s Comparisons, a study of the long comparisons in the Homeric poems (since  is a long simile).

Impact and contribution
The influence of Triphiodorus has been detected in the Dionysiaca of Nonnus of Panopolis (e.g. Nonn. D. 25.306, after Triph. 14), Coluthus’ Rape of Helen (e.g. Colut. 195–8, after Triph. 56–61), Musaeus’ Hero and Leander (e.g. Musae. 140, after Triph. 32) and Paul the Silentiary (e.g. Descr. Soph. 283, after Triph. 631).

Bibliography

Complete (and update) bibliographical record: https://sites.google.com/site/hellenisticbibliography/empire/triphiodorus

 Mair, W. A. transl., Oppian, Colluthus, Tryphiodorus (Loeb Classical Library Cambridge: Harvard University Press, 1958) 
 Giangrande, Giuseppe, Review: Tryphiodorus (The Classical Review, The New Series, Vol. 15, No. 3 Dec., 1965), pp. 282–283
 Smith, William, Dictionary of Greek and Roman Biography and Mythology (Walton & Maberly, 1859), pp. 1177–1178
 Knight, J.F.W., Iliupersides (The Classical Journal, Vol. 26, No. 3/4 Jul. - Oct., 1932), pp. 178–189
 Jones, W. J. Jr., Trojan Legend: Who is Sinon? (The Classical Journal, Vol. 61, No.3 Dec., 1965), pp. 122–128
 M. Campbell (1985), Lexicon in Triphiodorum, Hildesheim
 F. J. Cuartero Iborra (1988), Trifiodor, La Presa de Troia, Barcelona
 U. Dubielzig (1996), Triphiodor, Die Einnahme Ilions, Tübingen 
 B. Gerlaud (1982), Triphiodore, La Prise d’Ilion, Paris 
 E. Livrea (1982), Triphiodorus, Ilii excidium, Leipzig
 L. Miguélez-Cavero (2013), Triphiodorus, The Sack of Troy: A General Introduction and a Commentary, Berlin

Notes

External links 
 The Taking of Ilios in English

Late Antique writers
Year of birth missing
Year of death unknown
Roman-era Egyptians
3rd-century poets
4th-century Roman poets